Velimir Naumović Serbian Cyrillic: Beлимиp Haумoвић (19 March 1936 in Belgrade, Kingdom of Yugoslavia – 19 December 2011) was a Serbian striker who played for SFR Yugoslavia. He was often called Veljko (Velco) Naumović. During his managerial career he was nicknamed The saviour for his profound record of saving club from sticky situations.

Career
He first appeared on Kantrida his future club's ground in 1954 at Kvarnerska Rivijera where Red Star beat Rijeka 3:1 in the final of the tournament. During his military service in Rijeka he moved to the town's football club NK Rijeka. He stayed at the club for nine years and became a legend, being part being part of the club's first generation to play in the First League. During his time in Rijeka he got numerous offers to return to Red Star Belgrade but he stayed loyal to Rijeka. He played a total of 400 matches and scored 155 goals in all competitions.

In 1965 he moved to Belgian Standard Liège where he won two Cup and one League title. During his time in Belgium he was nicknamed "Yugoslav Puskás" for his superb playing. In the 1967–68 European Cup Winners' Cup the team got to the quarter final where they were defeated by AC Milan. After Standard Liège he moved to Frech club Stade Rennais in 1969. At the club he mostly played as a midfielder. He helped the club win 1971 Coupe de France their second trophy in history. He finished his career playing for low tier Belgian clubs Racing Jet and Tilleur.

After his playing career he managed NK Rudar Labin, NK Orijent, Tilleur, d'Abidjan and MC Alger.

Career statistics

Club

International matches

Honours
Red Star Belgrade
Yugoslav First League: 1955–56

NK Rijeka
Yugoslav Second League: 1957–58

Standard de Liège
Belgian First Division: 1968–69
Belgian Cup: 1966, 1967

Stade Rennais
Coupe de France: 1970–71

MC Alger
Algerian Championnat National: 1978–79

d'Abidjan
Ivory Coast Ligue 1: 1982, 1983
Coupe de Côte d'Ivoire: 1981, 1982
Coupe Houphouët-Boigny: 1981, 1982

Individual
Yugoslav Second League top goalscorer: 1957–58
NK Rijeka all time XI by: Novi List

References

External links

1936 births
2011 deaths
Serbian footballers
Serbian expatriate footballers
Yugoslav footballers
Yugoslavia international footballers
Association football forwards
Red Star Belgrade footballers
HNK Rijeka players
Standard Liège players
Ligue 1 players
Belgian Pro League players
Stade Rennais F.C. players
Racing Jet Wavre players
Expatriate footballers in Belgium
Expatriate footballers in France
Footballers from Belgrade
HNK Orijent managers
MC Alger managers
Serbian football managers
R.F.C. Tilleur players
R.F.C. Tilleur managers